Invisible Weapons is a 1938 detective novel by John Rhode, the pen name of the British writer Cecil Street. It is the twenty eighth in his long-running series of novels featuring Lancelot Priestley, a Golden Age armchair detective. A locked room mystery, the title revolves around the fact that two murders are committed by apparently invisible methods.

Synopsis
In suburban London, a man named Fransham is found dead after going to wash his hands in his niece's bathroom, an apparently locked room. The circumstances baffle the investigating officers of Scotland Yard until Priestley takes up the case, connecting it with another seemingly unrelated death.

References

Bibliography
 Evans, Curtis. Masters of the "Humdrum" Mystery: Cecil John Charles Street, Freeman Wills Crofts, Alfred Walter Stewart and the British Detective Novel, 1920-1961. McFarland, 2014.
 Herbert, Rosemary. Whodunit?: A Who's Who in Crime & Mystery Writing. Oxford University Press, 2003.
 Reilly, John M. Twentieth Century Crime & Mystery Writers. Springer, 2015.

1938 British novels
Novels by Cecil Street
British crime novels
British mystery novels
British thriller novels
British detective novels
Collins Crime Club books
Novels set in London